Tanjong Rhu MRT station is a future underground Mass Rapid Transit station on the Thomson–East Coast line in Kallang, Singapore. The station will be situated at the traffic junction of Tanjong Rhu Road and Tanjong Rhu Place, near the condominiums such Pebble Bay and Casuarina Cove. It also provides access to the Singapore Sports Hub via the Tanjong Rhu Suspension Bridge.

First announced in 2014, construction of the station started in 2016. It is expected to be opened along with the Phase 4 stations of the TEL in 2024.

History
On 15 August 2014, LTA announced that Tanjong Rhu station would be part of the proposed Thomson East-Coast line (TEL). The station will be constructed as part of Phase 4, consisting of 8 stations between Founders' Memorial and Bayshore, and is expected to be completed in 2024.

Construction has started in 2016, with expected completion in 2024. The contract also includes the construction of  cut-and-cover tunnels and a substation which will power the TEL tracks.

The construction of this station involves the construction of a cut-and-cover tunnel above the Kallang-Paya Lebar Expressway (KPE) tunnel. Steel sheet piles have to be driven into the ground to retain the earth and ensure the stability of both tunnels. In addition, to minimise ground movement, steel rods will be used to stabilise the excavated surface.

Initially expected to open in 2023, the restrictions on the construction due to the COVID-19 pandemic has led to delays in the line completion, and the date was pushed to 2024.

Station details
Located at the traffic junction of Tanjong Rhu Road and Tanjong Rhu Place, the station will serve the residents of the Water Place, Pebble Bay, Casuarina Cove, Camelot By-The-Water, Tanjong Ria, Parkshore and Sanctuary Green condominiums. When the station is completed, it will be between the Founders' Memorial and Katong Park stations. The station code will be TE23.

References

Proposed railway stations in Singapore
Mass Rapid Transit (Singapore) stations
Kallang
Railway stations scheduled to open in 2024